"How Could You" is a song by American R&B duo K-Ci & JoJo, written by Joe N Elias, Gloria E Harvey and Jonathan H. Robinson. It appears on the soundtrack to the film Bulletproof, and was also included on the duo's 1997 debut album Love Always as its closing track. It was a minor chart hit in both America and Australia, but was an even major one in New Zealand, peaking the Top 10.

Music video

The official music video for the song was directed by Brian Luvar.

Charts

Weekly charts

Year-end charts

References 

1996 songs
1996 debut singles
K-Ci & JoJo songs
MCA Records singles
Music videos directed by Brian Luvar
Songs written by Jon-John Robinson